Kiran Rathod (born 11 January 1981) is an Indian actress. She has acted in Tamil, Hindi, Malayalam, Telugu and Kannada films.

Early life
Rathod was born on 11 January 1981 in Jaipur. She is a cousin of actress Raveena Tandon. Rathod graduated with a degree in Arts from Mithibai College in Mumbai. After college she got into modelling and worked in a few Hindi pop albums. In 2001, she acted in the film Yaadein.

Filmography

Awards

References

External links
 
 
 

1981 births
Living people
Indian film actresses
Actresses in Tamil cinema
Actresses in Hindi cinema
Actresses in Telugu cinema
Actresses from Jaipur
Actresses in Malayalam cinema
21st-century Indian actresses
Actresses in Kannada cinema